The Long Island Sound are a United Women's Lacrosse League (UWLX) professional women's field lacrosse team based in Long Island, New York.  They have played in the UWLX since the 2016 season.  In the 2016 season, the four teams in the UWLX played in a barnstorming format, with all four teams playing at a single venue.

Franchise history
The Long Island Sound is one of the original four teams of the United Women's Lacrosse League (MLL). UWLX was founded by Digit Murphy and Aronda Kirby in a strategic partnership with STX. On February 23, 2016, Danielle Gallagher was announced as the first general manager in franchise history. On March 17, 2016, Shannon Smith was announced as the Sound's first head coach.

The first game in franchise history took place on May 28, 2016 at Goodman Stadium at Lehigh University in Bethlehem, Pennsylvania. Opposing the Baltimore Ride, Long Island prevailed by a 13-12 tally. The team's first-ever goal was scored by McKinley Curro, who would also score the league's first-ever two-point goal. Devon Wills served as the starting goaltender, allowing the first goal in UWLX history to Baltimore Ride but also registered the first win in league history.

Draft history
The following represented the Sound’s inaugural draft class. Devon Wills would be the first player drafted in franchise history.

See also
Women's Professional Lacrosse League
Major League Lacrosse, the professional men's field lacrosse league in North America
National Lacrosse League, the professional men's box lacrosse league in North America
List of professional sports teams in the United States and Canada

References

 

 

United Women's Lacrosse League
Women's lacrosse teams in the United States
Lacrosse clubs established in 2016
2016 establishments in New York (state)
Sports in Long Island
Lacrosse teams in New York (state)
Women's sports in New York (state)